Colobothea septemmaculata is a species of beetle in the family Cerambycidae. It was described by Dmytro Zajciw in 1971. It is known from Brazil and French Guiana.

References

septemmaculata
Beetles described in 1971